Flight is a graphic novel anthology edited by Kazu Kibuishi and published annually since 2004. Originally published by Image Comics, it has since moved to Ballantine Books, an imprint of Random House. The most recent volume is number 8, published June 28, 2011.

Flight